Izabela Paszkiewicz ( Trzaskalska, born 9 January 1988) is a Polish long-distance runner. She competed in the women's marathon at the 2017 World Championships in Athletics.

References

External links
 

1988 births
Living people
Polish female long-distance runners
Polish female marathon runners
World Athletics Championships athletes for Poland
Place of birth missing (living people)